Podger may refer to:

People
 Andrew Podger (born 1948), Australian public servant
 Julian Podger (born 1966), English tenor singer and member of Gothic Voices
 Rachel Podger (born 1968), English violinist

Fiction
 'Podger' Pam Jolly, a minor character in the TV drama series Bad Girls
 Uncle Podger, a character in Jerome K. Jerome's Three Men in a Boat
 My Uncle Podger, a 1975 picture book by Wallace Tripp, based on the Jerome K. Jerome character

Other uses
 Podger spanner, a tool consisting of a tapered bar with a wrench at one end